The Hernád is a river in Slovakia and Hungary.

Hernád may also refer to:

 Hernád István Róbert (born 1945), Hungarian cognitive scientist
 Hernád János, Hungarian mathematical physicist
 Hernád, Hungary, a municipality in Dabas District, Pest County, Hungary